This article lists various football records in relation to the Israel national football team.

Records in this section refer to Eretz Israel football team from its first official game in 1934 to 1948 and to the Israel national football team since Israel Declaration of Independence in 1948.

The page is updated where necessary after each Israel match, and is correct as of 15 November 2015.

Appearances
 Most appearances: Yossi Benayoun, 102; 18 November 1998 – 9 October 2017
 Longest Israel career: Yossi Benayoun, 18 years 325 days; 18 November 1998 – 9 October 2017
 Shortest Israel career: Ze'ev Haimovich, 3 minutes, 17 October 2007 vs Belarus
 Youngest player: Gai Assulin, 16 years 350 days; 26 March 2008, vs. Chile
 Oldest player: Yossi Benayoun, 37 years 157 days; 9 October 2017, vs. Spain
 Most appearances as a substitute: Yossi Benayoun, 33
 Most times substituted off: Eyal Berkovic, 44
 Most appearances as a substitute without ever starting a game: Ofer Shitrit, 6

Goals
 First goal (as Eretz Israel): Avraham Nudelman; 16 March 1934, 1–7 vs. Egypt
 First goal (as Israel): Shmuel Ben-Dror; 26 September 1948, 1–3 vs. USA Olympic Team
 Most goals: Eran Zahavi, 33; 2 September 2010 – 12 November 2021
 Most goals in a match: Mordechai Spiegler, 4; 25 September 1968, 4–0 vs. USA
 Youngest scorer: Ben Sahar, 17 years 206 days; 28 March 2007, vs. Estonia
 Oldest scorer: Avi Nimni, 33 years 231 days; 7 September 2005, vs. Faroe Islands
 Youngest player to score a Hat-trick: Shlomi Arbeitman; 18 years 270 days, 18 February 2004, vs. Azerbaijan
 Scoring in most consecutive matches: Yehoshua Feigenbaum, 5; 28 May 1974 – 9 October 1974
 Most goals on debut: Shlomi Arbeitman, 3; 18 February 2004, 6–0 vs. Azerbaijan
 Most different goalscorers in one match: 6, 18 January 1991, 7–0 vs. Estonia
 Most goals scored in a single game: 9; 28 February 2001, 9–0 vs. Chinese Taipei on 23 March 1988
 Most goals scored during the first half: 5 goals, 18 January 1999 vs. Estonia and 6 September 1974 vs. Philippines
 Most goals scored during the second half: 7, vs Chinese Taipei on 23 March 1988
 Highest scoring draw 3–3 vs United States on 15 September 1968, vs Greece on 12 March 1969, vs Wales on 8 February 1989, vs Croatia on 9 February 2005 and vs Portugal on 22 March 2013
 Largest defeat: 7–1 vs Egypt on 16 March 1934 and vs Germany on 13 February 2002 
 Largest defeat at home: 5-0 vs Denmark on 13 November 1999, 2–7 vs Argentina on 4 May 1986 
 Most goals conceded during a home game: 7, vs Argentina on 4 May 1986 
 Most goals conceded during the first half: 4, vs Egypt on 16 March 1934
vs Yugoslavia on 21 August 1949
 Most goals conceded during the second half: 5, vs Italy on 4 Novamber 1961, Argentina 4 May 1986

Managers
 Most AFC Asian Cup wins: Yosef Merimovich, 1
 Most matches as coach: Shlomo Scharf, 82
 Most matches won as coach: Shlomo Scharf, 31 
 Most matches draws as coach: Shlomo Scharf, 18
 Youngest coach: Avram Grant, 47

Notes

External links
 RSSSF – List of Official Games

Records
records and statistics
National association football team records and statistics